Benjamin David Francis  (born 4 June 1992) is a British businessman and entrepreneur. He is the founder and CEO of Gymshark.

With a stake over 70% in Gymshark, Francis has a net worth of £700m as of 2021.

Early life 
Francis grew up in Bromsgrove, Worcestershire. He attended South Bromsgrove High School. He first became interested in computing after studying IT at school. His first business was an online company that sold car license plates.

Francis started going to the gym as a teenager. He later said "the structure, consistency and work ethic I found in the gym I realised, could be applied to different areas of my life and it would work".

In 2010, he studied international business and management at Aston University. He has said his time at university gave him "a strong foundation on which to build a business". He dropped out in 2012 to focus on Gymshark full-time.

Career

Early career 

While at university between 2010 and 2013, he worked for Pizza Hut as a delivery boy earning £5 an hour. He left six months after launching Gymshark.

In 2012, aged 19, he launched Gymshark in his parents' garage with school friend Lewis Morgan. The website initially sold fitness supplements. Unable to afford to buy stock or secure distribution deals with supplement suppliers, he began dropshipping supplies from other vendors and it took him six weeks to make his first sale.

Gymshark 
Gymshark began life as a supplements company. In 2013, branching out from supplements, Francis began designing and selling fitness apparel on Gymshark's website.

He began manufacturing the products from his parents' garage in Bromsgrove, using a sewing machine and screen printer he bought with £1,000 of savings. He learned how to sew from his grandmother. In 2013, branching out from supplements, Francis began designing and selling fitness apparel on Gymshark's website.

In 2013, he exhibited Gymshark's products at the BodyPower fitness trade show in Birmingham. After the trade show ended, a tracksuit went viral on Facebook, generating £30,000 in sales within 30 minutes. Francis later left university and quit his job at Pizza Hut to focus on the company full-time.

As a start-up, Francis marketed the brand through partnering with social media influencers, including YouTube body builders Nikki Blackketter and Lex Griffin. Gymshark was one of the first brands to make extensive use of social media influencers.

In 2015, Francis stepped down as CEO of the company to become chief marketing officer, chief brand officer and chief product officer. At the time, he said the move would allow the company "to grow even more quickly" and give him time to "work on my weaknesses and become a more rounded businessperson".

In 2018, Gymshark opened a new £5 million headquarters in Solihull, West Midlands. In 2019, Gymshark opened its own branded gym and innovation hub. Since 2016, Gymshark has been listed on The Sunday Times Fast Track of fast-growing private companies. The company currently sells products in 131 countries.

In August 2020, Gymshark sold a 21% stake to US private equity firm General Atlantic in a deal which valued the company in excess of £1 billion. Francis currently owns more than 70% of the company, which is worth £700 million.

In August 2021, he resumed the role of CEO.

Francis was appointed Member of the Order of the British Empire (MBE) in the 2023 New Year Honours for services to the business sector.

Personal life 
Francis is a car and motorcycle enthusiast, and a season ticket holder at Aston Villa.

In 2018, Francis was included on a Forbes 30 Under 30 list.

In 2019, Francis served on the UK Government's Business Council for Entrepreneurs.

In 2020, Francis was awarded the EY UK Entrepreneur of the Year Award.

Francis and his girlfriend Robin Gallant were engaged in April 2021, and married on 9 September 2021. On 8 September 2022, Francis announced that they were expecting twins. Their twin sons were born on 24 December 2022.

References

Living people
British company founders
Alumni of Aston University
People from Bromsgrove
Members of the Order of the British Empire
1992 births